Margaret O'Mahony is an Irish civil engineer. She is the Professor of Civil Engineering at Trinity College Dublin.

O'Mahony completed a bachelor of engineering in civil engineering at NUI Galway and a doctorate from the Department of Engineering Science, University of Oxford.

She is chair of the civil engineering at Trinity College Dublin, the first female to hold the position that was established in 1842.

References

External links 

 
 

Fellows of Trinity College Dublin
Irish civil engineers
Irish women engineers
Alumni of the University of Galway
Alumni of the University of Oxford
21st-century Irish engineers
21st-century women engineers
Year of birth missing (living people)
Living people